Sappinia pedata is a species of Amoebozoa. Sappinia is a free-living amoeba (a single-celled organism), found in the environment. This organism can cause granulomatous amoebic encephalitis (GAE), however, only one case of GAE due to S. pedata infection has ever been reported, and the patient survived without any long-term consequences.

References

Discosea